The Net River is a  river in Michigan in the United States. Its headwaters rise in Baraga County and flow southwest into Iron County, where the main stem forms and flows to the Paint River above Crystal Falls.

See also
List of rivers of Michigan

References

Michigan  Streamflow Data from the USGS

Rivers of Michigan
Rivers of Baraga County, Michigan
Tributaries of Lake Michigan